Peter Kaack (born 9 December 1943) is a retired German football player. He spent ten seasons in the Bundesliga with Eintracht Braunschweig.

Honours
 Bundesliga champion: 1966–67

References

External links
 

1943 births
Living people
German footballers
Germany under-21 international footballers
Eintracht Braunschweig players
Bundesliga players
Association football defenders